Luka Dominić (born 1 December 1993 in Čakovec) is a Croatian professional footballer who plays for Jadran-Galeb.

Club statistics

Updated to games played as of 18 May 2014.

References
MLSZ 

1993 births
Living people
Sportspeople from Čakovec
Association football midfielders
Croatian footballers
Kaposvári Rákóczi FC players
Nemzeti Bajnokság I players
Nemzeti Bajnokság II players
Croatian expatriate footballers
Expatriate footballers in Hungary
Croatian expatriate sportspeople in Hungary